Pietru "Peter" Caxaro (c. 14001485) was a Maltese philosopher and poet. He is so far Malta's first known philosopher, fragments of whose works are extant. His philosophical views and positions qualify him as an honourable adherent of the mediaeval humanist movement. His contribution skilfully stands as a mature reflection of the social and cultural revival of his time.

Caxaro's cultural preparation and his humanistic character, together with his philosophy, entirely reflect the peculiar force, functions and needs of a Mediterranean people whose golden age had still to come, but whose mental constitution and mode of expression were readily set. The discovery of the man and his philosophy is immeasurably relevant to further recognition of the wise tenure of an ancient civilization.

No portrait of Caxaro has been found.

Family 

Peter Caxaro was born of a noble Mdina family in Malta. The date of his birth is unknown, and it is doubtful that it had ever been recorded at all. He was likely born around the beginning of the 15th century.

His father's name was Leo, and his mother's Zuna. It might be possible that the family was of Jewish descent and had been forced to convert to Christianity. It is known that one of Caxaro's brothers, Nicholas, was killed in 1473 following a brawl with people from Siġġiewi, Malta, because of a girl he was secretly seeing.

Studies and offices 

Caxaro's first studies were undertaken in Malta. Later, he went to Palermo, Sicily, to pursue them further. At the time, Palermo was a flourishing city imbued with the spirit of Renaissance humanism. There, Caxaro completed his studies and became a notary in 1438. A couple of months after his graduation, he was appointed judge at the courts of Gozo for the years 1440-1441. In 1441, he also sat as judge in the courts of Malta, and the similarly in 1475. He was judge at the civil courts in 1460-1461, 1470–1471 and 1481–1482, and judge at the ecclesiastical courts in 1473 and 1480-1481.

Caxaro was also jurat at the Town Council of Mdina in 1452-1453, 1458–1459, 1461–1462, 1469–1470, 1474–1475 and 1482-1483. He was a notary or secretary to the same council in 1460 and 1468.

He possessed considerable property at the northern side of Malta, and was the owner of six slaves.

Friendship with Dominicans 

During all this time, Caxaro was on very good terms with the Dominican friars. These had a monastery at Rabat, Malta, very close to Mdina, Caxaro's home-town and centre of operation. The Dominicans had originally arrived in Malta around 1450, and quickly forged good friendships amongst the literary population and professional people, including academics. Towards the end of the 15th century, the Dominicans could boast of erudite friars amongst their fold, such as Peter Xara, Peter Zurki, Dominic Bartolo (who was also Pro-Inquisitor for some cases of the Inquisition in Malta) and Bartolomeus Pace.

Caxaro was certainly a good friend of some of these men, both for intellectual as well as personal reasons. The fact that he designated the Dominicans as his general inheritors, or residuary legatees, in his will is proof enough of this.

Marriage attempt 

Around 1463, Caxaro aspired to marrying a widow, Franca de Biglera. However, her brother, a Canon at the bishop's cathedral chapter, objected on the grounds of “spiritual affinity”, since Caxaro's father was a godfather to Franca.

Despite the fact that Caxaro did all he could to win Franca over, and also obtained the official blessing of the bishop of Malta, the marriage did not take place. To the great consternation of Caxaro, Franca changed her mind.

Caxaro remained a bachelor to the end of his days.

Excommunicated 

At the Town Council of Mdina Caxaro had three particular themes which he seemed to come to life about: the welfare and maintenance of his hometown Mdina, the education of the common people, and the accountability of civil servants.

In 1480, Caxaro took an active and bold part in an issue which involved the bishop of Malta, who was suspected of corruption. Caxaro was vehement against such corruption, and vigorous in his demand for an immediate remedy. In June 1480, as an act of retaliation, the bishop excommunicated him, an action which was considered immensely serious in those days. Nevertheless, Caxaro was unyielding in his opposition and demands. Consequently, the bishop interdicted him. However, Caxaro was nonetheless undaunted.

The issue lingered on until the first half of the following year, when the bishop had to accede to Caxaro's and the Town Council's demands. Accordingly, the excommunication and the interdict were removed. Caxaro's determination and resolve in the matter were highly praised.

Death 

On August 12, 1485, Caxaro drew up his will, and died a few days later. The precise date of his death is still not known with any certainty. All his possession went to the Dominican friars.

It is not known where he was initially buried. However, later, as he had it willed, his remains were laid to rest in one of the newly built chapels of the church of St. Dominic at Rabat, Malta. The chapel had been actually constructed at Caxaro's expense, and dedicated to Our Lady of Divine Help.

A memorial was unveiled within the same chapel over Caxaro's tomb on September 30, 1992.

Caxaro's cultural formation

Unveiled 

Peter Caxaro was virtually unknown until he was made famous in 1968 by the publication of his Cantilena by the Dominican Mikiel Fsadni and Godfrey Wettinger. It was Fsadni who discovered the Cantilena on September 22, 1966, at the back of the third page from the last in the first of Reverend Brandan Caxaro's notarial registers (1533–1536), currently numbered R175, in the Notarial Archives, Valletta. Caxaro's work was actually transcribed by Rev. Brandan himself in its original Maltese version. The discovery was encountered with enthusiasm within scholarship circles since it had eventually given Maltese literature its greatest boost for a very long time. It had taken the authors about two years before they were able to present Caxaro's Cantilena to the general public.

The authenticity of Caxaro's work is undoubtable, and so is Brandan's transcription. The discoverers themselves, both reliable historical researchers, carefully examined the document and found that it could not reveal any suspicious feature. It was next to impossible for the document to have been faked so well that no sign of its faking remained.

Up till 1968, modern scholarly references to Peter Caxaro had been few. The first known to have referred to him was the Dominican Paul Galea in his history of the Dominicans at Rabat, Malta, published in 1949. Further data was produced by Michael Fsadni O.P. in 1965, also attempting his hand at a similar history. Both friars based their information on a common source; namely, on the Descrittione delli Tre Conventi che l’Ordine dei Predicatori tiene nell’Isola di Malta, I, 1, by Francesco Maria Azzopardo O.P., written about 1676.

Mention of Caxaro had also been made in a work preceding Azzopardo's by approximately three decades. This had been by Giovanni Francesco Abela's 1647 publication entitled (in short) Della Descrittione di Malta.

The man 

Introducing his transcription of the composition, Rev. Brandan – a member of the Society of True Christians – indicated its author as a "philosopher, poet and orator".

On examination, it is positively held that Caxaro's original version was in the Maltese tongue, and that Rev. Brandan transcribed it as faithfully as possible as he recalled it. The composition proves that Caxaro's qualification as a philosopher, poet and orator is fully justified since its construction is professionally accomplished. He certainly was a man of learning.

Lately, a few proposals have been made which held that the said composition, in part or as a whole, does not have Peter Caxaro as its author. It has been said that the poem is none other than Rev. Brandan's innocent transcription in Latin characters of a Megrebian or Andalusian qasida. The proponent unscientifically based his suppositions, as he himself said, on an “extrasensorial impression”. Thus the author hastily concluded that the qualifications attributed to Caxaro by Rev. Brandan are spurious.

The truth, however, seems to be otherwise. Caxaro's competence as a poetic writer, apart from his philosophic and oratorical skills, is highly estimable. He seems to qualify as a phonetic master, as well as one having control of classical rhetoric techniques. He has tact in expressing his veiled poetic thought in striking and tempting allusions. In other words, Caxaro is a forceful writer, possessing clarity of thought, and is confident in handling of style. The Cantilena is a piece of fine literature; the work of dextrous mastership. It shows a very particular formal attention, and an uncommon capability of stylistic invention in its structure.

It must be noticed, however, that Giovanni Francesco Abela, in his Descrittione of 1647, did not include Caxaro in his list of some forty-six Houmini di Malta per varie guise d’eccellenza celebri, e famosi, of which not all are that illustrious. Abela could have mentioned Caxaro's philosophic, poetic or oratorical skills, if anything. This may suggest that Caxaro's aptitudes were somewhat concealed.

The known sources of Caxaro's biographical data are few, namely four, the State Archives of Palermo, Sicily (Protocollo del Regno, mainly vol. 34), the National Library of Malta (Universitas, 11), the Archives of the Dominicans, Rabat (Ms. 321, Giuliana Antica, I), and Della Descrittione di Malta Isola nel Mare Siciliano con le sue Antichità, ed altre Notitie of Giovanni Francesco Abela, printed by Paolo Bonecota, Malta, in 1647 (passim).

The first known date regarding Caxaro is April 1, 1438, when he set for the examination to be given the warrant of public notary of Malta and Gozo by the competent authorities in Palermo, Sicily. In those times, Malta and its dependencies formed part of the Kingdom of Aragon. This means that Caxaro had spent some time in Palermo, a city then imbued with humanism.

Next, we are informed of a series of appointments in Malta and Gozo between 1440 and 1483, a span of forty-three years. Alternatively or concurrently, at one time or another Caxaro acted as judge in the civil courts of Gozo and of Malta, and in the ecclesiastical cours. He was further juror in Malta at the Mdina city-council, to which he sometimes acted as secretary.

Finally, the Dominicans at Rabat, Malta preserve a substantial part of his will, drawn on August 12, 1485, shortly before his death. No wife or offspring are mentioned in the will.

Caxaro had willed that he be buried in the Dominican newly built church at Rabat, as eventually happened. in a chapel built at his own expense, dedicated to the Gloriosissima Vergine del Soccorso.

It is further known with certainty that Peter Caxaro was a native of Malta, born of Maltese parents, and lived at Mdina. His date of birth is still unknown. His immobile property was considerable, though not exuberant. It is known that he had in his service at least six slaves.

Apart from Caxaro's public offices and death, which is satisfactorily documented, two other personal episodes are known. The first, occurring either in 1463 or 1478, concerns his proposed marriage to Francha di Biglera. From the court proceedings we know that Caxaro's father had frequently visited Catalonia (specifically Barcelona and Valencia). This may have some bearing on Peter's own formation.

The second instance concerns the murder of Caxaro's brother, Cola, in 1473 at Siggiewi, Malta, which may have given a not-so-good reputation to his family.

The most recent significant addition to the personal data and profile of Peter Caxaro was made by Frans Sammut in 2009. He suggested that Caxaro came from a Jewish family that had been converted to Christianity. In support of his claim he proposed that Caxaro's Cantilena was in fact a zajal, which in Arabic refers to a song which the Jews of Spain (and Sicily) adopted and promoted.

Extant fragments 

Little of Caxaro's scholarship is known to exist. Much work has yet to be accomplished in this difficult field. We only possess isolated parts of his contributions, the most complete being the Cantilena, which, in itself, comes down to us through an imperfect, indirect source.

That Brandan's transcript of the Cantilena is faulty is evident from various internal traits. Furthermore, the reasons for which Brandan recalled the work, and even the manner in which he did so, is unto this day a baffling uncertainty. The cheerfulness felt by Brandan apparently seems to be doubly caused, namely by both the memory of the composition and the memory of his ancestor (with a necessary relationship of one to the other). Brandan's opening sentence of the short prologue seems to suggest that he was gladdened more by the relationship than by any of the related parts. Wettinger and Fsadni had suggested that it was the consolation which Brandan saw in the content of the composition that prompted him to leave us a memory of it, writing it down in one of the registers of his acts. But this is a question which must still be open to discussion.

The first to seriously suspect certain imperfections in Brandan's transcript was Joseph Brincat in 1986, suspicious of the verses which do not have any rhyme. He specifically refers here to the four lines of the refrain (vv. 7-10) and the first four lines of the second stanza (vv. 11-14). Brincat, guided by his erudition as by common sense, concludes that the quatrain which stands on its own between the two stanzas, of six verses and ten verses each respectively, is erroneously transcribed by Brandan. Brincat very aptly provides convincing internal evidence for the error. Brincat's important conclusion was followed by other scholars, and to which we also subscribe here.

Apart from the Cantilena, other fragments concerning Caxaro's contributions are extant, namely, a few judicial sentences passed by Caxaro at the ecclesiastical courts, and secretarial minutes taken at the Mdina town-council meetings in which Caxaro took part. Both are naturally extra-philosophical in nature.

The sentences, however interesting they may be, only give us an inkling into the equilibrate soberness of Caxaro. Herein, we search in vain for any of Caxaro's own original thinking, apart from the arid judicial and official terminology.

The same may be said of the municipal acts. Only here the information provided regards Caxaro's context in matters which interested his town (Mdina) particularly, and the Maltese Islands in general. Caxaro's name is mentioned at least in some 267 sittings of the council between 1447 and 1485. At most of these, he had a minor say; at other times, his share is more substantial. Some acts are also written in Caxaro's own hand.

The philosopher 
Philosopher is the title attributed to Caxaro by Rev. Brandan. In the rest of the Cantilena’s prologue, which is formally in accord with the general practice of the times, the poetic rather than the philosophical or oratorical excellences of Caxaro are emphasized. These are left in the shadow, even by modern scholars. It has been naively ventured that the appellative philosopher is to be understood merely in the sense of a man of wisdom or learning (“bniedem gharef”, literally indicating a sophist rather than a philosopher). However, being a trustworthy notary in possession of a precise vocabulary (to which the rest of the prologue, at least, is witness), Rev. Brandan is to be understood in a strict sense. The hope of the discovery of corroborative material in this regard must remain enkindled.

The fact that a man's philosophy is to be detected from nothing more than a fragment of his written thought, however substantial it may be, does not make novelty in the history of philosophy. Innumerable cases of the sort may be found to exist, including philosophers of a gigantic stature, such as the Miletians, or even Aristotle himself.

The same is to be said regarding the poetic form of Caxaro's extant philosophy. We have similar cases with philosophers of outstanding relevance, such as the Eleatics, including Parmenides himself, the father of philosophy. However, here, with Caxaro's case, the question is slightly more complex. We do not have to do with a then out-going poetic custom in an age where prose took the precedence, as in the Greek naturalistic philosophers (of the 5th century BCE). We are in the context of (15th-century) Medieval philosophy, highly susceptible to classical literature, both Greek and Roman, but particularly to Plato and Aristotle. Here, more than anything else, the poetic form is a technique, an expressive and cognitive distinction.

Some scholars today, especially those brought up in a scholastic tradition, would like to qualify a philosophic work from its systematic nature. Such a definite distinctness would have philosophers like Aristotle, Avicenna, Albertus Magnus, Aquinas, and the like, fitting like drawers. On the other hand, however, it would unwittingly exclude, if none other, Plato himself, the archetype philosopher of all time, who, unlike the scientist Aristotle, is an artist prior to being a philosopher. The Corpus Platonicum stands as evident testimony.

Thus Caxaro is part of a tradition which may characteristically and properly be called platonic. The accent here would fall less on unsystemization, and more on narration, or better, on the myth-type philosophy in its technical connotation. From the formal, essential aspect, we are in the line of Plato, St. Augustine and the Medieval neo-Platonists, especially those with a humanistic formation in the early Renaissance period. This was later continued by people like Descartes, Pascal, Rousseau, Nietzsche, and the like. In general, it is a philosophical trend commencing with an ideal response, technically speaking, to Parmenides' concept of being, marked with an intense attention to the affective functions in man, to that knowledge acquired through a volitive prompting, and further manifested with an openness to flexibility. Though the will is duly valued, the intrinsic mental capabilities of man are held to be necessary, prior to the senses, in discovering the true object of knowledge, that being which is different and superior to mere sense data.

A Humanistic character 

It seems to be opportune at this point to highlight two instances from Caxaro's acquaintances, namely, his father's contact with Barcelona and Valencia, and Caxaro's own connection with Palermo.

Humanist Catalonia 

Catalonia, together with Aragon, became familiar with humanism before Castille. The first contact of the Catalan scholars with the movement was at its first appearance at the Pontifical court of Avignon, where Petrarch sojourned, and at the Council of Constance (1414–1418), Basle (1431) and Florence (1438–1455), as at the Neapolitan court of Alphonse V of Aragon, so-called El Magnanimo (died 1458).

The Catalan movement was initiated by Juan Fernandez' efforts in the 14th century. Fernandez travelled to the East and returned with many Greek manuscripts. He later established himself as a translator, compiler and commentator of classical texts, therefore giving rise to a literary culture concerned with human interests.

Fernandez was followed by other men of standing, such as Pedro de Saplana, a Dominican (14th century), Antonio Canals, Bernat Metge (c.1340-1413), Carlos de Aragon (1421–1461), nephew of King Alphonse V, and Bachiller Alfonso de la Torre (15th century). These men of letters concentrated on the works of Aristotle, Boethius, Petrarch, Boccaccio, Marcianus Capella, Pedro Campostella, and the like. They were additionally highly instrumental in animating the cultural centres of Barcelona and Valencia with the spirit of humanism.

It would not be surprising that Caxaro's father, in the course of his constant voyaging between Catalonia, Sicily and Malta, like so many other tradesmen of his time, came in contact with the then prevailing environment of Spain's Mediterranean city-harbours. Here, as elsewhere, humanism was not restricted to mere cultural circles, but had become the philosophy of the people. Caxaro, apart from his father, had other members of his family, together with many of his townfolk, taking part in this same commerce of goods and ideas.

Humanist Palermo 

King Alphonse the Magnanimous of Aragon, asserting his seat at Naples, and set in giving additional splendour to the reign of Aragon, was successful in changing the Neapolitan court in one of Renaissance's most brilliant great centres. Naples and its favoured twin Palermo were visited by the most eminent of humanists from all over the Italian peninsula, Catalonia, Castile and Aragon.

From the first half of the 15th century onwards, Palermo went through an enormous and impressive economic, demographic and urbanistic development, manifesting a substantial cultural facelift. Though the times were rather difficult due to the frequent incursions of the Turks, and the disastrous effect of epidemics and other diseases, the enthusiasts of the humanæ litteræ were great in number. Up to Caxaro's visit to Palermo many native men familiar with the studia humanitatis made a name for themselves and for their town, scholars like Giovanni Aurispa and Giovanni Marrasio.

As in the case of Catalonia, the spirit of humanism was imported to Sicily from Northern Italy where large numbers of Palemitans went to study. Prior to 1445, when the Studio di Catania was established, it was Palermo which attracted the largest number of law students. These were centres where the classical texts were circulated mainly in manuscript form. In those days, the large number of intellectuals and law students considered the juridical culture as instrumental in acquiring a worthy social standing. The general lines of this discussion, however, had already been quite satisfactorily described by Wettinger and Fsadni in 1968.

More interesting comments had been advanced from the perspective of literary criticism. However, much work has to be done in this field, especially by scholars with professional standing on mediaeval Arabic, Spanish and Sicilian idioms, dialects and poetic forms.

Due to the Cantilena’s uniqueness interesting results have been put forward by historical linguistics, emphasising the drastic changes in the Maltese language over a span of four centuries.

What interests us here, however, is not the Cantilena’s literary value as much as its philosophical content. Before proceeding further, it would be opportune to give the transliteration of the Cantilena:

 Xideu il cada ye gireni tale nichadithicum
 Mensab fil gueri uele nisab fo homorcom 2
 Calb mehandihe chakim soltan ui le mule
 Bir imgamic rimitine betiragin mecsule 4
 fen hayran al garca nenzel fi tirag minzeli
 Nitila vy nargia ninzil deyem fil-bachar il hali 6

 [Omission]

 Huakit hy mirammiti Nizlit hi li sisen
 Mectatilix il mihallimin ma kitatili li gebel 8(12)
 fen tumayt insib il gebel sib tafal morchi
 Huakit thi mirammiti lili zimen nibni 10(14)
 Huec ucakit hi mirammiti vargia ibnie
 biddilihe inte il miken illi yeutihe 12(16)
 Min ibidill il miken ibidil il vintura
 halex liradi ‘al col xebir sura 14(18)
 hemme ard bayda v hemme ard seude et hamyra
 Hactar min hedaun heme tred minne tamarra 16(20)

Paraphrased in English:

 The recital of misfortune, O my neighbours, come I’ll tell you
 Such as has not been found in the past, nor in your lifetime.
 A heart ungoverned, kingless, and lordless
 Has thrown me into a deep well with steps that stop short;
 Where, desiring to drown, I descend by the steps of my downfall;
 Rising and falling always in the stormy sea.

 My house has fallen! It has pushed the foundations.
 The workmen did not trespass, the rock gave way.
 Where I had hoped to find rock, I found loose clay.
 The house I had long been building has collapsed.
 And that’s how my house fell! And build it up again!
 Change the place that harms it.
 He who changes the place changes his fortune;
 For each land makes a difference with every span;
 There is white land and black and red land;
 More than this, there is that from which you’d better leave.

Idiosyncratic analysis 

At its appearance in 1968 the Cantilena had been declared to be not readily understandable by today’s generation. The publishers themselves found it “terribly difficult and absolutely daunting”. The interpreter, it had been said, had to be a philologist, a Maltese, one in possession of Arabic, familiar with the history of Malta, and well informed on the author of the composition. It must be admitted that a foreigner, even if expert in this field of study, but unfamiliar to a Maltese way of thinking, will find the text difficult and obscure.

The main idea of the text, the so-called “physical interpretation”, is simple enough. An uncontrollable person had been responsible for the collapse of a building which the author considered to be his. In other words, he had misjudged the situation. The theme seems to follow a definite scheme, namely, an apparently simple one: an invocation (vv. 1-2), the narration of an unhappy love event and the lyric I's situation thereby (vv. 3-6), its delusion (vv. 7-10, 11-14), and finally its attempt to reverse the misfortune (vv. 15-20). It is a scheme which in its content resembles the general classical Semitic (specifically Arabic) qasida pattern.

A point of curiosity might be interesting here. As from the beginning of 1450, the Mdina town-council had been discussing the precarious state of the town walls (the mirammerii) of Mdina. In March of that same year, the Augustinian Matteo di Malta had been commissioned as the town-council's ambassador to lead the talks with the viceroy on the question so as to provide funds for their urgent restoration. Little, if any, progress seems to have been made on the matter, until at the beginning of 1454 an internal tower of the castle at mdina collapsed. So as to take immediate action and prevent further immanent collapse of the walls, at the town-council sitting of January 11 Peter Caxaro, acting as secretary, spoke in favour of an urgent collecta (which was later effected), with the approval of the whole house. Furthermore, on May 24, Nicholas Caxaro, Peter's brother, had been appointed by the council as supramarammerius to supervise the restoration of the walls. On that occasion, Peter Caxaro had highly praised the decision taken. Strictly by way of speculation, it seems interesting to associate the Cantilena’s mirammiti to Mdina’s marammerii (being the same term). What is said in the Cantilena’s refrain might be identified to the disastrous collapse of part of Mdina's walls in 1454. The Cantilena might have been inspired from that serious occasion, which was the effect of a general negligence. Supposing that the Cantilena had been sung to some of those noblemen at the town-council who were collaborators of Caxaro (as is possible), such speculation might hold some water.

Apart from the immediate and superficial message, we obviously have a more profound and veiled communication. The overall drift of this so-called “metaphysical interpretation”, has been seen to be the ruin of the author's project, either concerning his career or a love affair. The general melancholic tone of the composition did not pass unnoticed, though it had been recognised that the final note sounded the victory of hope over desperation; the building anew over the ruins of unfulfilled dreams or ambitions.

In 1977 Wettinger categorically denied that the murder of Caxaro's brother had any relevance to the theme of the Cantilena. On the other hand, he proposed that it may have to do with Caxaro's marriage proposal which apparently went up in smoke. The suggestion had been confirmed jointly by Wettinger and Fsadni in 1983.

Though presumably well calculated, it would seem that the comments put forward so far reveal little depth, hinging on to a restricted inspection of the matter. This may have somewhat betrayed Caxaro's philosophic prowess. Some have audaciously stated that the composition has no depth of feeling at all. Others have indeed valued its content highly, wisely noting that the subject is entirely profane (as opposed to the sacred), and moreover sheds light on the concrete versus abstract thinking of the populace (a feature common amongst Mediterranean peoples unto this day); reality against illusion.

What mostly concerns us here is Caxaro's idiosyncrasy in order to comprehend the entire complexity of his thought as it appears synthetically in the text. His cognitive peculiarities as well as his cultural shared-interests jointly constitute his marked philosophical views and positions.

The text 
An idiosyncratic analysis of the Cantilena implies the minute examination of its constitution, particularly of the ideas expressed therein. In the first place we shall describe the intrinsic pattern in philosophical terms:

A. VV. 1-2: THE INVOCATION: TRIAD OF COMMUNICATION

 1. The Subject: Xideu il cada/… Mensab fil gueri uele nisab fo homorcom = vv. 1a-2
 2. The Object: ye gireni = v. 1b
 3. The Relation: tale nichadithicum = v. 1c

B. VV. 3-6: THE LAMENTATION: CAUSATION

 I – The Cause (vv. 3-4)

 1. The Active Agent (Primary Cause): Calb mehandihe chakim soltan ui le mule = v. 3
 2. The Action: Bir imgamic rimitine betiragin mecsule = v. 4

 II – The Effect (vv. 5-6)

 1. The Cooperative Action (Instrumental Secondary Cause): fen hayran al garca nenzel fi tirag minzeli = v. 5
 2. The Passive Agent: Nitila vy nargia ninzil deyem fil-bachar il hali = v. 6

C. VV. 7(11)-10(14): THE NARRATION: LOGIC

 I – An Implicit Question: Stating the Predicate [P] and the Copula [C] without a Subject [S]

 1. The fact [F]: Huakit [C1] hy (emphatic demonstrative pronoun of P1) mirammiti [P1] = v. 7(11)a
 1a. Association of P1 with li sisen [P2]: a necessary relationship

 II – Tentative Solution [TS1]

 2. F + a Progressive Disclosure [PD] [Fact F2]: Nizlit [C2] hi [S2] (emphatic demonstrative pronoun of P1) li sisen [P2] = v. 7(11)b
 2a. Association of P2 with il mihallimin [S3]: a necessary relationship

 III – Elimination of a Possibility [TS2]

 3. F2 + further PD [F3]: Mectat… [C3] (negative) … ilix [P3] il mihallimin [S3] = v. 8(12)a
 3a. Association of P2 with li gebel [S4]: a necessary relationship

 IV – Affirmation of a Possibility [TS3]

 4. F3 + more PD [F4]: ma kitat… [C4] (positive) …ili [P4] li gebel [S4] = v. 8(12)b
 4a. Association of P2 with il gebel [P5]: a necessary relationship

 5. F4 + more PD [F5]: fen (preposition) + [S5 understood] + tumayt insib [C5] (positive) il gebel [P5] = v. 9(13)a
 5a. Association of P2 with tafal [P6]: a contingent relationship

 6. F5 + more PD [F6]: [S6 understood] + sib [C6] (positive) tafal [P6] morchi (adjective qualifying tafal) = v. 9(13)b

 V – Restating the Implicit Question (which is now merely rhetorical)

 6a. Return to F (= Conclusion of Syllogism) [F']: identification of P and S (in a reflexive action)

 7. Repetition of v. 7(11)a = v. 10(14)a
 7a. Association of P1 with li… [part of C8]: a contingent relationship

 8. Qualification of mirammiti [P1]: [S8 understood] + lili zimen nibni [C8] (positive) + [P8 understood] = v. 10(14)b

Simplifying the whole syllogism, we have the following:

 1. If
 [S1?]
 [C1] Huakit
 [P1] mirammiti,

 2. And if
 [S2] hi (i.e., mirammiti)
 [C2] Nizlit
 [P2] li sisen,

 3. And
 [S3] il mihallimin
 [C3] Mectat…
 [P3] …ilix;

 4. Then
 [S4] li gebel
 [C4] kitat…
 [P4] …ili;

 5. And
 [S5] (Jien; I)
 [C5] tumayt insib
 [P5] il gebel;

 6. And
 [S6] (Jien; I)
 [C6] sib
 [P6] tafal (morchi):

 7. Reaffirming n. 1:
 [C1] Huakit
 [P1] mirammiti,

 8.
 [S8] li… (Jien; I)
 [C8] …ili zimen nibni
 [P8] (lilha; it).

The structure seems to be based on four moments, namely:

 (1) the true rock and the apparent rock (i.e., the clay)
 (2) on which the foundations were built
 (3) by the workmen
 (4) for the erection of the house

The blame for the collapse of the house is given to none of the moments save the appearance of something real, namely, of the rock (i.e., the clay).

D. VV. 11(15) – THE RENEWAL: METAPHYSICS

 I – The Moment of Restoration (vv. 11-12{15-16})

 1. The Defeat: Huec ucakit hi mirammiti = vv. 11(15)a
 2. The Turning Point: vargia ibnie = v. 11(15)b
 3. The Moral: biddilihe inte il miken illi yeutihe = v. 12(16)

 II – The Philosophy of Man (vv. 13-16{17-20})

 1. Man’s Vulnerability: Min ibidill il miken ibidil il vintura / halex liradi ‘al col xebir sura = vv. 13-14(17-18)
 2. Truth Perception: hemme ard bayda v hemme ard seude et hamyra / Hactar min hedaun heme tred minne tamarra = vv. 15-16(19-20)

Caxaro's philosophy 

Given the aforementioned background to Caxaro's thought we shall hereunder indicate introductory and merely signalatory problematics proper to the philosopher under study. The suggested propositions can neither be exhaustive nor comprehensive but may simply aid our understanding of Caxaro's philosophical positions.

The common tongue 

In the first place it is never enough to emphasise the use of the (Maltese) vulgar idiom by Caxaro. This marked a qualitative leap which resulted from a humanistic formation. The option to express himself with masterly skill while positively valuing highly the language of the people, as opposed to the Latin and Sicilian idioms of the cultured class, indicates real quality on the part of Caxaro. Not only is it a mere choice of tongue but, over and above, it is the adherence to a set mentality peculiar to a geographic territory.

It also shows the worth given to a local culture and heritage, considering it capable of standing on its own two feet on an equal par with that of other neighbouring countries. The use of the Maltese vulgar tongue is not a call for independent rule but an affirmation of a native identity characteristic of a people.

Humankind at the centre 

Similarly important is the profane theme and nature of Caxaro's composition. This marks a further sign of Caxaro's humanistic character. The Cantilena is not a-religious or anti-Christian but it decidedly does not belong to what is sacred, religious or biblical. It is definitely not irreverent or blasphemous but it characteristically considers life, persons and their surroundings from a human standing.

The theme dwells on the qualities distinctive of the human nature, such faculties which affirm the astonishing skills of humans and their intrinsic power to transcend the otherwise despairing limitations of their essential characters. Caxaro's composition in fact shows a trustworthy reliance on the spiritual, or better, immaterial possibilities of humans. The Cantilena can thus rightly be considered a profession of faith in humankind.

Such a belief reverts our attention to the classical humanism of the Sophists and of Socrates himself, a school which immensely inspired early Renaissance philosophy. We note here the surpassing of the merely naturalistic mentality of the classics, placing humans at the centre of serious consideration. The classical excellence of proposing natural solutions to age-old problems, over and above the former religious tentative answers, must not be discarded from the context.

The sphere of reality 

The concreteness of Caxaro's reflections stands out loud and clear against any theoretical speculation. The arid, scholastic, professional terminology and mental structure is completely done away with. The practical existential perspective to life and reality is preferred. This may be considered typically Maltese in nature or at least Mediterranean where an acute common sense is noticeable in everyday dealings.

Caxaro's inclination towards action rather than speculation, subordinating (though not eliminating) the latter to the former reveals his inclination towards the platonic school and away from Aristotelico-Scholastic categories of thought.

This, indeed, marks yet another asset to his humanistic character; a trait so strongly felt in the movement.

Myth vs. Logos 

Narration in Caxaro, as elsewhere, does not imply shallowness. Nor does it hint at an incapability to express oneself otherwise, namely, in arbitrary (professional) terms. Narration must be considered also as a scientific genre of expression. In fact, it is a traditional technique rich in history where sophistication is purposely ignored, choosing a more fluid, free and inclusive mode of communication.

Caxaro's composition, following the line of Plato's own professional preferences, is shrouded in a linguistic and conceptual veil so as to incite us to an active surmise. Its very narrative construction prompts our latent curiosity to probe the hidden meaning under the apparently shallow surface.

As opposed to a technical (“Aristotelico-Scholastic”) form, which is almost always intrinsically rigid and lineated, even if more immediate and direct, Caxaro's philosophy is given under the disguise of a narration which has a reality of its own.

While Caxaro himself synthetically states his concepts, especially as regards the unpleasantness of illusion, he prefers to express himself under “deceptive” clothing. The objective nature of his philosophy is thus skilfully guarded behind a screen through which a mere sensuous perception fails to penetrate.

Allegory vs. Parable 

Caxaro's narration cannot be taken as a puerile typification of moral or spiritual relations. It is futile to search for strict correspondence between each and every figure he uses and concrete occurrences in life, his or any other. It is on these grounds that the “marriage proposal” interpretation must not be taken seriously, for it despoils Caxaro's composition from its abounding intrinsic qualities.

Correspondences do exist indeed in the Cantilena between the various symbolisms which Caxaro harmoniously employs. In truth, he does not simply portray an image for the mere artificial imitation of its external form but moreover dwells on the wealthy analogous qualities of the theory of symbols so widely used in the Middle Ages.

At this point it is essential to note that the use of allegory in Caxaro's Cantilena, in accordance with Mediaeval usage, adheres to a subject under the semblance of narrative suggesting similar characteristics. In all probability, Caxaro may not be referring to one single case but to a life-situation in general. The use of an allegory technically functions as a stimulation to further reflection; an openness to the mystery and riddle of life.

Truth vs. Appearance 
This is an important theme in the Cantilena, maybe carrying the greatest consequence for the whole composition. “Fen tumayt insib il gebel sib tafal morchi” (“Where I hoped to find rock I found soft clay”, v. 13{19}) gives us the hint.

This may well be the key to the composition's enigma. We have here a juxtaposition of an apparent truth (a pseudo-truth) and the truth itself.

In its most general terms this is a metaphysical problem. It marks human's encounter with a reality which is in itself concealed and garbed with the immediate consciousness and evidence of the sensible. Caxaro eventually contrasts the phenomenal to the noumenical reality, that is, the object of the senses, to which he was attracted in the first place, and the object of the intellect, which he discovered posteriorly. Caxaro's emphasis, however, and this is his proper characteristic in this sphere, is less on the intuitive function of humans and more on experiential undergoing. The senses are the media with which the real is arrived at.

The theme is an echo of Plato's most fundamental problematic. Plato opposes appearance to the truth (reality), to which he identifies life. To the former he identifies existence. Appearance stops at the level of things which are not of any prime importance save as a vehicle of thought. A general superficiality in life at large is a result of constant and persisting shallowness in all aspects of humans’ being. The ability, on the other hand, to go to the heart of things, to the truth of reality, to life itself, would make this appearance ineffective.

Metaphysics 

Caxaro's ontological and epistemological philosophy, together with his psychology, commences with the concrete experience of defeat and impotency (see v. 11{15}). It is not a momentary despondency but rather a state of being. It is the consciousness of humans helplessly succumbing to a reality which overshadows them.

From the reflection of this mode of existence determined by circumstances there arises in Caxaro the humanistic trigger to break out of the humiliating condition (diametrically opposed to the humanizing condition) by a rediscovery of the intrinsic spiritual power within humans themselves. “Vargia ibnie” (“and build it up again”, v. 11{15}) recalls Petrarca's call for rebirth; a reblooming out of the dust. This marks an essential moment in the rekindled faith and confidence in oneself to overcome helplessness and inertia.

Action now takes the fore (see v. 12{16}). The place of the distorted vision of reality, of the illusory appearance which ruins human living, is to be taken by a fresh renewed conception and introspection. We have here the (spiritual) decision, founded on knowledge, to drastically and decidedly opt for a higher quality of life, namely by the choice of the truth, however troublesome, instead of pseudo-truth (that is, presumed being).

Similarly, being a state of living, this is an option in favour of science, religion, the Church, the State, and the like. Over and above, it is an option in favour of individual personality. All of this is in opposition to pseudo-science, -religion, -Church, -State, and pseudo-personality.

Thus humans are indeed vulnerable and susceptible to the riddle of existence (see vv. 13-14{17-18}). It is their sense of real ascertainment, their capability of applying their judging faculties with right measure (see vv. 15-16{19-20}), that gives them the right sense of direction.

Logic 

No minute examination of Caxaro's logic as presented in vv. 7-10{11-14}. Caxaro's formal logic seems to be characteristic of his times, showing a notable departure from the former scholastic logic. His syllogism is simple. It avoids complicated compounds. It is based on mental associations of necessary and contingent relationships.

The first four propositions seem to form two pairs of conditional statements, called “consequential” by the mediaevalists, with true status for both the “antecedents” and the “consequents”. The remaining four follow from the former propositions and seem to be constructed on the first inferential schemata of traditional logic.

Causation 
Caxaro seems to have in mind notions other than the archaic Aristotelian concepts of cause. The whole of vv. 3-4 recall one of the motive forces which Empedocles called “Strife”, accounting for the dissolution or decay of the other force, “Love”, which is the principle of generation.

Furthermore, Plato's own concept of cause seems to play an additional part. The forms, or formal causes, of things are proposed by Plato to give account for the changes in the world. It seems that Caxaro, especially in v. 3, touches upon this idea.

In general, the mediaeval humanists consistently attempted to avow Aristotle's concepts whenever possible, including those of cause. However, his influence was never completely cancelled. Consequently, they tried to adhere to other theories of causation, especially those, as Caxaro's lines seem to demonstrate, which do not admit of any necessary consequence, if not with further qualifications.

Communication 

The triad at the head of the Cantilena is part of the general narrative theory of language. It rests on two legs, namely, Caxaro's examined life, a tenet proceeding from Socrates and Plato up to Petrarch, and further on the transmission of that experience.

This is opposed to the teaching of an otherwise abstract theory, somewhat confirming a superiority of the subject of communication over the object of that communication. A narration of an undergone experience strictly speaking does not rest on the cognitive understanding of the addressee but on his affective capabilities, which to some degree are universal. In other words, it calls for sympathy of sentiments.

Caxaro's narration, in which he takes a clear philosophical position, retracts from being an instruction, whether it moral or dogmatic. The narration qualifies as an announcement of the discovery of an all-important immaterial world, over and above mere semblances.

Symbolism 
In this context one can easily comprehend the nature of the language used by Caxaro: an expressive mode which, in accordance with his general philosophy, is intrinsically unconfined and porous. It is likewise based on a theory of correspondences.

Caxaro does not seem to employ images in an unrelated (or extrinsically related) aloof manner. He does not merely appropriate their external form in some way. Caxaro aptly creates a harmony of nuances amongst the symbols he uses, taking advantage of their mutual agreeability. Moreover, he presents them in an analogous relationship with his world of being through the understanding of that world as an indissoluble unity.

Caxaro's symbols, like those of the Megalithics in Malta and the posteriors Eleatics in Greece, are neither simple nor artificial. They do not point to the author's identification to the images qua images. Caxaro's peculiar material expression presupposes a prior cosmic spiritual relationship between all matter.

This is a philosophy very proper to the mediaeval philosophers, especially those of the so-called Platonic school.

Unfortunately, here we must sadly restrain myself from going into each and every symbolic implication of the Cantilena. The qualities of the symbolism of the heart (calb, v. 3), the well (bir, v. 4), the steps (…tiragin and tirag, vv. 4 and 5 respectively), the water (bachar, v. 6), the house (miramm{a}…, vv. 7{11}, 10{14} and 11{15}), the foundations (sisen, v. 7{11}), the rock (gebel, vv. 8{12} and 9{13}), the land (miken, vv. 12{16} and 13{17}; …rad… and ard, vv. 14{18} and 15{19}), and the colours (bayda, white; seude, black; hamyra, red, v. 15{19}), are all proportional to other qualities in humans themselves, who are also part of a coherent, interconnected reality.

Each symbol used by Caxaro is given a qualification, thus modifying their absoluteness. At the same time he recognises their contingent being in relation to humans themselves. The heart is qualified with “mehandihe chakim soltan ui le mule” (“ungoverned, kingless and lordless”, v. 3). The well with “imgamic” (“bottomless”, v. 4). The steps with “mecsule” and “mizeli” (“stop short” and “downfall” respectively, v. 4). The water with “il hali” (“stormy” or “deep”, v. 6). The house with “lili zimen nibni” (“I had long been building”, v. 10{14}).

The rest of the symbolisms follow an indirect qualification. The foundations with “tafal morchi” (“soft clay”, v. 9{13}). The rock with “kitatili” (“gave way”, v. 8{12}). The land with “vintura” and “sura” (“fortune” and “difference”, vv. 13{17} and 14{18} respectively). The colours with “ard” (“land”) itself (v. 15{19}).

Of course, the qualification are essential as the correspondences themselves, and also as much as the logical associations of vv. 7(11) to 10(12), where symbolism has a major role.

See also 
Philosophy in Malta

References

Sources in chronological order 
1949
 1. Galea, P., Sidtna Marija tal-Ghar: Il-Crypta, il-Knisja u l-Kunvent (Our Lady of the Grotto: The Crypt, the Church and the Convent), Giov. Muscat, Malta, particularly pages 62 and 63.

1965
 2. Fsadni, M., Il-Migja u l-Hidma ta’ l-Ewwel Dumnikani f’Malta: 1450-1512 (The Arrival and Work of the First Dominicans in Malta), Lux Press, Malta, particularly pages 53 and 54.

1968
 3. Wettinger, G. and Fsadni, M., Peter Caxaro’s Cantilena, Lux Press, Malta.
 4. Aquilina, J., “Foreword”, Peter Caxaro’s Cantilena, Lux Press, Malta, preliminary pages.
 5. M.V.S., “Peter Caxaro’s Cantilena” (Review), The Teacher, October–December, page 39.
 6. Cassola, A., “Poema Maltija ta’ zmien il-medju evu: Sejba li titfa’ l-origini tal-letteratura Maltija zewg sekli ’l quddiem” (A Maltese poem from the middle ages: A discovery which moves forward the origin of Maltese literature by two centuries), Il-Qawmien, November, page 9.
 7. Cachia, P., “Il-Cantilena ta’ Pietru Caxaro xhieda tal-qdumija ta’ l-ilsien Malti” (Peter Caxaro’s Cantilena is proof of the antiquity of the Maltese Language), Il-Berqa, 9 November, page 4.
 8. Bonavia, K., “L-eqdem poezija bil-Malti: Cantilena ta’ Pietru Caxaru” (The earliest poem in Maltese: the Cantilena of Peter Caxaro), Il-Haddiem, 13 November, page 4.
 9. Buttigieg, T., “Peter Caxaro’s Cantilena” (Review), The Bulletin, 15 November, page 6.
 10. P.D.M., “Poezija Maltija tas-seklu hmistax” (A Maltese poem of the 15th century), It-Torca, 17 November, page 11.
 11. Chetcuti, G., “Cantilena ta’ Pietru Caxaro: Poezija bil-Malti medjovali (The Cantilena of Peter Caxaro: A mediaeval Maltese poem)”, L-Orizzont, 19 November.
 12. Grima, J., “A poem in medieval Maltese” (Review), Maltese Observer, 1 December.
 13. Xuereb, P., “Dawn of Maltese literature?”, The Sunday Times of Malta, 15 December, page 24.
 14. Serracino-Inglott, E., “Il-Cantilena ta’ Pietru Caxaro” (The Cantilena of Peter Caxaro), Il-Poplu, 20 December, pages 10 and 11.
 15. Zammit Gabaretta, A., “Peter Caxaro’s Cantilena” (Review), Melita Historica, V, 1, pages 66 and 67.
 16. Vassallo, K., Vatum Consortium jew il-Poezija bil-Malti (Kindred Voices or Poetry in Maltese), Malta, particularly pages 584 till 586.

1969
 17. Depasquale, V.A., “A poem in medieval Maltese”, Malta Today, IV, January, pages 12 and 13.
 18. B.M., “Il-Poezija Maltija tas-seklu 15” (Maltese 15th century poetry; review), Problemi ta’ Llum, IX, 1, January, page 26.
 19. G.C.P., “Peter Caxaro’s Cantilena” (Review), Il-Malti, March, pages 27 till 29.
 20. Ellul, T., “Cantilena”, Il-Polz, 9 March, page 14.

1970
 21. Cachia, P., “Peter Caxaro’s Cantilena” (Review), Journal of Semitic Studies, XV, 1, University of Manchester, pages 140 and 141.
 22. Mallia, B., “Il-Cantilena ta’ Pietru Caxaro” (Peter Caxaro’s Cantilena), Problemi ta’ Llum, X, 4, April, pages 118 till 125.

1971
 23. Xuereb, P., “Cantilena – First known poem in the Maltese Language”, Poezija, 1, Ottubru, pages 16 till 19.

1972
 24. Fenech, D., “Il-Kantilena ta’ Pietru Caxaro: L-iktar monument qadim tal-letteratura Maltija” (Peter Caxaro’s Cantilena: The most ancient monument of Maltese literature), Il-Mument, 2 April, page 12.

1973
 25. Aquilina, J., “Maltese Etymological Glossary”, Journal of Maltese Studies, VIII.

1974
 26. Fsadni, M., Id-Dumnikani fir-Rabat u fil-Birgu sal-1620 (The Dominicans at Rabat and Birgu until 1620), Il-Hajja, Malta, particularly pages 52 and 53.

1975
 27. Cowan, W., “Caxaro’s Cantilena: A checkpoint for change in Maltese”, Journal of Maltese Studies, X, pages 4 till 10.
 28. Luttrell, A.T., ed., Medieval Malta: Studies on Malta Before the Knights, The British School at Rome, Londra, particularly pages 66 and 67.

1977
 29. Fenech, D., Wirt il-Muza (The Muse Heritage), Malta, particularly pages 12 till 16.

1978
 30. Wettinger, G., “Looking back on ‘The Cantilena of Peter Caxaro’”, Journal of Maltese Studies, XII, pages 88 till 105.
 31. Bin-Bovingdon, R., “Further comments on Peter Caxaro’s Cantilena”, Journal of Maltese Studies, XII, pages 106 till 118.

1979
 32. Friggieri, O., Storja tal-Letteratura Maltija (A History of Maltese Literature), I, Lux Press, Malta, particularly pages 87 and 119.
 33. Wettinger, G., “Late medieval Judeo-Arabic poetry in Vatican Ms. (Hebr.) 411: Links with Maltese and Sicilian Arabic”, Journal of Maltese Studies, XIII, pages 1 till 16.

1980
 34. Wettinger, G., “Honour and shame in the later 15th century Malta”, Melita Historica, VIII, 1, particularly pages 63 till 77.

1981
 35. Wettinger, G., “Late medieval Judeo-Arabic poetry in Vatican Ms. (Hebr.) 411: a postscript”, Journal of Maltese Studies, XIV, pages 56 till 58.

1983
 36. Wettinger, G. and Fsadni, M., L-Ghanja ta’ Pietru Caxaru: Poezija bil-Malti Medjevali (The Song of Peter Caxaro: A poem in mediaeval Maltese), Malta.
 37. Friggieri, O., “Il-kwistjoni tal-lingwa (2): Djalett Gharbi u Kultura Ewropea” (The Language Question: Arab dialect and European culture), Lehen is-Sewwa, 6 August, page 7.
 38. Cassola, A., “On the meaning of gueri in Petrus Caxaro's Cantilena”, Melita Historica, VIII, 3, pages 315 till 317.
 39. Grima, J.F., “L-Ghanja ta' Pietru Caxaru, poezija bil-Malti Medjevali” (The Song of Peter Caxaro, a poem in mediaeval Maltese; review), Melita Historica, VIII, 4, pages 345 and 346.

1984
 40. A.A.M. (Agius Muscat, A.), “L-Ghanja ta’ Pietru Caxaru” (The Song of Peter Caxaro; review), It-Torca, 1 January, page 14.
 41. C.J.A., “L-Ghanja ta’ Pietru Caxaro” (The Song of Peter Caxaro; review), L-Orizzont, 16 January, page 4.
 42. Massa, A., “L-eqdem poezija bil-Malti” (The earliest poem in Maltese; review), Il-Hajja, 20 January, page 4.
 43. A.A.M. (Agius Muscat, A.), “Xi jfisser ghalina Pietru Caxaru?” (What does Peter Caxaro mean to us?), It-Torca, 22 January, page 14.
 44. Grima, J.F., “The first known writing in Maltese” (Review), The Democrat, 11 February, page 11.
 45. Grima, J.F., “L-Ghanja ta’ Pietru Caxaro” (The Song of Peter Caxaro; review), Il-Mument, 12 February.
 46. Zammit Ciantar, J., “Il-Ghanja ta’ Pietru Caxaru” (The Song of Peter Caxaro; review), Saghtar, April, page 11.
 47. Aquilina, J., “Oldest poem in Maltese” (Review), The Sunday Times, 20 May, page 12.

1985
 48. Grima, J.F., “Peter Caxaro and his Cantilena”, The Democrat, 3 August, page 9.
 49. Korrispondent, “Il-500 anniversarju mill-mewt ta’ l-eqdem poeta Malti”, In- Taghna, 28 August, page 9.
 50. Fenech, E., “F’eghluq il-500 sena mill-mewt ta’ Pietru Caxaru: L-ghanja ta’ Pietru Caxaru” (In commemoration of 500 years from Peter Caxaro’s death), Il-Hajja, 29 August, pages 7 and 12.

1986
 51. Brincat, G., “Critica testuale della Cantilena di Pietro Caxaro” (Textual criticism of Peter Caxaro’s Cantilena), Journal of Maltese Studies, 16, pages 1 till 21.
 52. Cassola, A., “Sull’autore del vv. 11-14 della Cantilena di Petrus Caxaro” (On the author of vv. 11-14 of Peter Caxaro’s Cantilena), Melita Historica, IX, 3, pages 119 till 202.
 53. Cohen, D. and Vanhove, M., “La Cantilene maltaise du Xveme siecle: remarques linguistiques” (The Maltese Cantilena of the 15th century: linguistic remarks), Comptes Rendus du Groupe Linguistique d’Etudes Chamito-Semitiques (G.L.E.C.S.), XXIX-XXX, 1984-1986, Libr. Orientaliste Paul Geuthner, Paris.
 54. Friggieri, O., Storia della letteratura maltese (A history of Maltese literature), Edizioni Spes, Milazzo, particularly page 88.

1987
 55. Friggieri, O., Il-Ktieb tal-Poezija Maltija (The Book of Maltese Poetry), Testi maghzula u migbura bi studju kritiku, I, Il-Versi mill-bidu sa tmiem is-seklu dsatax, Klabb Kotba Maltin, Valletta, Malta, particularly pages 2 and 3.

1989
 56. Friggieri, O., Saggi sulla Letteratura Maltese (Essays on Maltese Literature), Malta University Press, Malta.

1990
 57. Kabazi, F., “Ulteriori considerazioni linguistiche sulla Cantilena di Pietro Caxaro”, Journal of Maltese Studies (Further linguistic remarks on Peter Caxaro’s Cantilena), 19-20, 1989-1990, pages 42 till 45.
 58. Bonnici, T., “Galican-Portuguese traits in Caxaro’s Cantilena”, Journal of Maltese Studies, 19-20, 1989-1990, pages 46 till 51.

1992
 59. Montebello, M., Pietru Caxaru u l-Kantilena Tieghu (Peter Caxaro and His Cantilena), Malta.
 60. Montebello, M., “The humanist philosophy in Peter Caxaro’s Cantilena: A study of a representative of humanism in Maltese philosophy”, Pietru Caxaru u l-Kantilena Tieghu, Malta, pages 15 till 38.
 61. Friggieri, O., “Il-Kantilena ta’ Pietru Caxaru: Stharrig kritiku” (Peter Caxaro’s Cantilena: A critical investigation), Pietru Caxaru u l-Kantilena Tieghu, Malta, pages 39 till 55.

1993
 62. Ellul-Vincenti, N., “L-eqdem kitba bil-Malti” (The earliest writing in Maltese; review), In-Nazzjon, 20 April, page 16.
 63. Fiorini, S., “Malta in 1530”, Hospitaller Malta: 1530-1798, ed. by Victor Mallia-Milanes, Mireva Publications, Malta, particularly pages 179, 184 and 197.
 64. Cachia, L., “Il-parallelizmu fil-Kantilena ta’ Caxaro” (Parallelism in Caxaro’s Cantilena), Il-Mument, 10 October, page 30.

1994
 65. Friggieri, O., “Main trends in the history of Maltese literature”, Neohelicon, XXI, 2, The Netherlands, particularly pages 59 till 69.
 66. Cachia, L., L-Ilsien Malti: Il-Bierah u l-Lum, Sensiela Kotba Socjalisti, Malta, particularly page 90.
 67. Fsadni, M., Esperjenzi ta’ Kittieb (Experiences of a Writer), Pubblikazzjoni Dumnikana, Malta, particularly pages 32 till 47, 104, and 120 till 127.

1995
 68. Montebello, M., Stedina ghall-Filosofija Maltija (An Invitation to Maltese Philosophy), PEG, particularly pages 96 till 99.
 69. Cassola, A., “Two Notes: Brighella and Thezan: The Cantilena, Maltese and Sicilian Proverbs”, Journal of Maltese Studies, 1994-1995, 25-26, pages 58 till 66.
 70. Friggieri, O., “Pietru Caxaru: il-Kantilena” (Peter Caxaro: the Cantilena), L-Istudji Kritici Migbura (An Anthology of Critical Studies), I, Oliver Friggieri, Malta University Services, Malta, pages 4 and 5.

1996
 71. Friggieri, O., Il-Poezija Maltija (Maltese Poetry), Malta University Press, Malta, particularly page 1.

1997
 72. Fsadni, M., Qlubija, Tweghir u Farag f’Sekli Mqallba (Courage, Trepidation and Consolation during Turbulent Centuries), Pubblikazzjoni Dumnikana, Malta, particularly pages 19-20 and 37-38.

1999
 73. Brincat, J.M., “The Cantilena”, Karissime Gotifride (Dear Godfrey), ed. by P. Xuereb, Malta University Press, Malta, pages 177 till 183.
 74. Brincat, J.M., “The Cantilena: Vintura. Why? Who?”, Karissime Gotifride (Dear Godfrey), ed. by P. Xuereb, Malta University Press, Malta, pages 107 till 113.

2000
 75. Cassola, A., The Literature of Malta: An example of Unity in Diversity, Kummissjoni Ewropea u Minima, particularly pages 7 till 17.
 76. Brincat, J.M., Il-Malti: Elf Sena ta’ Storja (The Maltese Language: A thousand years of history), Kullana Kulturali, 10, Pubblikazzjonijiet Indipendenza, Malta, particularly pages 90 till 94
 77. Friggieri, O., “Il romanticismo italiano e l’inizio della poesia maltese” (Italian romanticism and the beginning of Maltese poetry), Culture e civiltà del Mediterraneo, 1, Apulia, XXVI, 2, Puglia, Italy.

2001
 78. Montebello, M., “Caxaru, Pietru” (Caxaro, Peter), Il-Ktieb tal-Filosofija f’Malta (The Sourcebook of Philosophy in Malta), I, Kullana Kulturali, 22, Pubblikazzjonijiet Indipendenza, Malta, pages 74 till 75.
 79. Montebello, M., “Kantilena” (The Cantilena), Il-Ktieb tal-Filosofija f’Malta (The Sourcebook of Philosophy in Malta), I, Kullana Kulturali, 22, Pubblikazzjonijiet Indipendenza, Malta, pages 269 till 270.
 80. Friggieri, O., L-Istorja tal-Poezija Maltija (The History of Maltese Poetry), Kullana Kulturali, 29, Pubblikazzjonijiet Indipendenza, Malta, particularly page 7.
 81. Briffa, C., “Investigazzjoni stilistika tal-Kantilena” (The Cantilena), Il-Kitba bil-Malti sa l-1870 (Maltese Literature up till 1870), Guzè Casar Pullicino, Kullana Kulturali, 31, Pubblikazzjonijiet Indipendenza, Malta, Appendix I, pages 183 till 206.
 82. Cassar, C., “Malta: Language, Literacy and Identity in a Mediterranean Island Society”, National Identities, 1469-9907, III, 3, pages 257 till 275.
 83. Farrugia, S., “The Cantilena by Pietrus Caxaro”, https://web.archive.org/web/20060222065029/http://www.my-malta.com/interesting/cantilena.html.

2004
 84. Werner, L., “Europe’s new Arabic connection”, Saudi Aramco World, LV, 6, pages 2 till 7.

2006
 85. Montebello, M., “La filosofia di Pietro Caxaro” (The Philosophy of Peter Caxaro), Melita Theologica, LVII, 1, pages 33 till 48.

2008
 86. Baheyeldin, K.M., “Il-Cantilena of Malta: How much can a modern day Arab decipher from the oldest Maltese literature?”, The Baheyeldin Dynasty (blog), http://baheyeldin.com/writings/culture/il-cantilena-malta-how-much-can-modern-day-arab-decipher-oldest-maltese-literature.html, 1 November, especially the comments made and the answers given.

2009
 87. Sammut, F., Kummenti, 23 February, http://www.timesofmalta.com/articles/view/20090222/local/jewish-bones-in-rabat-are-ours.
 88. Sammut, F., “Il-Kantilena ta’ Caxaro u l-Imdina: Poezija wahdanija tal-Medjuevu” (The Cantilena of Caxaro and Mdina: A solitary mediaeval poem), Il-Mument, 19 April, pages 8 till 10.

Further reading
List of related academic journals

15th-century Maltese philosophers
1400 births
1485 deaths
Maltese poets
Maltese male poets
People from Mdina
Maltese-language poets